Chromium-vanadium steel (symbol Cr-V or CrV; 6000-series SAE steel grades, often marketed as "chrome vanadium") is a group of steel alloys incorporating carbon (0.50%), manganese (0.70-0.90%), silicon (0.30%), chromium (0.80-1.10%), and vanadium (0.18%). Some forms can be used as high-speed steel. Chromium and vanadium both make the steel more suitable for hardening. Chromium also helps resist abrasion, oxidation, and corrosion. Chromium and carbon can both improve elasticity.

See also
 SVCM

References

Steels